Year 574 (DLXXIV) was a common year starting on Monday (link will display the full calendar) of the Julian calendar. The denomination 574 for this year has been used since the early medieval period, when the Anno Domini calendar era became the prevalent method in Europe for naming years.

Events 
 By place 
 Byzantine Empire 
 December 7 – Emperor Justin II retires due to recurring seizures of insanity; he abdicates the throne in favour of his general Tiberius. Justin proclaims him Caesar and adopts him as his own son.
 Winter – Empress Sophia and Tiberius agree to a one year truce with the Persians, at the cost of 45,000 solidi. The truce applies only to the Mesopotamian front; in the Caucasus, war continues.

 Europe 
 King Cleph is murdered after an 18-month reign by a guard, a slave who he has mistreated. For the next decade, the Lombard Kingdom is governed by independent duchies (Rule of the Dukes).
 The Visigoths under King Liuvigild invade Cantabria (Northern Spain), and destroy the city of Amaya (Burgos). He massacres the inhabitants and adds the province to the Visigothic Kingdom.
 Áedán mac Gabráin becomes king of Dál Riata (Scotland) (approximate Date).

 Asia 
 The Persian Empire overthrows the Axumite- and Byzantine-affiliated regimes in Yemen (Arabian Peninsula).

 Unidentified 
 A major volcanic eruption occurs in the Antarctic.

 By topic 
 Religion 
 July 13 – Pope John III dies at Rome after a 13-year reign, until June of next year the Holy See becomes sede vacante.
 Marius Aventicensis is made bishop of Aventicum (modern Avenches).

Births 
 February 7 – Shōtoku, prince and regent of Japan (d. 622)
 Xiao Yu, prince of the Liang Dynasty (d. 647)

Deaths 
 July 13 – Pope John III
 Cleph, king of the Lombards (or 575)
 Conall mac Comgaill, king of Dál Riata
 Xuan, empress of Northern Zhou
 Queen Jiso

References 

Bibliography